Sussex wine is wine produced in the historic county of Sussex in southern England, a region divided for administrative purposes into East Sussex and West Sussex (as well as the unitary authority of Brighton and Hove). In 2016 wine made in Sussex accounted for about a quarter of the total wine produced in England; with over 50 vineyards, Sussex produces more wine than any other county in the UK. In 2016 Sussex wine was granted protected regional status by the Department for Environment, Food and Rural Affairs (DEFRA). DEFRA has also applied to the European Union for Protected Designation of Origin status in the European Union's Geographic Indication scheme.

Sussex's sparkling wine in particular has drawn comparisons with Champagne and is sometimes rated as some of the best in the world.

History
It is likely that wine has been produced in Sussex for around 2,000 years.  It is likely that wine was produced either by the late Iron Age tribes such as the Belgae and Regni or by the Romans who governed what was to become Sussex.

Vineyards in England produced significant amounts of wine in the 12th and early 13th centuries. However this came to an end in the 13th and 14th centuries as the Medieval Warm Period began to end, the Black Death reduced the workforce and wine was increasingly imported from Gascony. By 1275 the vineyard at Battle Abbey had ceased grape production.

The Bolney wine estate was established at Bolney near Haywards Heath in 1972 by Janet and Rodney Pratt, and was one of the first commercial vineyards in England.

There are numerous other vineyards throughout the county on various soils ranging from chalky soils such as Rathfinny in Alfriston, to clay and silt over sandstone in the Rother Valley such as Oastbrook Estate in Bodiam. 

Peter Hall planted his vineyard at Breaky Bottom on the South Downs near Lewes in 1974 at a time when there were only a dozen or so growers in the whole country.

Plumpton College is the UK's specialist centre for wine research and training.  Its purpose-built wine centre opened in 2014.  It is the only establishment in Europe to offer undergraduate degrees in Wine Business and Production taught in the English language.

Geography and climate

The region has a warm climate and soil types similar to the Champagne district, which lies on the 49th parallel north, while the Sussex Weald lies on the 51st parallel north.One vineyard, Oastbrook sits exactly on the parallel, Sussex has many south-facing slopes, which are suitable for growing the grape varieties found in sparkling wine, such as Chardonnay, Pinot Noir and Pinot Meunier.

Climate change has also impacted the climate of Sussex. According to the Meteorological Office, 14 out of the 15 warmest summers on record have been in the 21st century. This means that what winemakers can grow in Sussex has changed.  In addition, the cooler evenings and cool evening sea breezes in Sussex allow the grapes to develop high levels of natural acidity when fully ripe – crucial for sparkling wine and allowing harvesting to take place in October.

Viticulture and grapes
Oastbrook Estate near Bodiam grows Pinot Meunier, Pinot Noir, Chardonnay, Pinot Gris and Pinot Blanc  grapes on its south-facing slopes. In the 20th century the cooler climate had restricted the varieties of grape that could grow in Sussex to a range of Germanic varieties.

Winemaking and styles

Classification
The application for PDO status is the second in the UK after the Camel Valley in Cornwall was submitted in 2012.  Sussex is the first major wine area in the UK to apply.  An application for PDO status was submitted to the European Union in 2016.   Formal certification could take several years to be agreed by the European Commission.  Until the process is ratified by the EU, Sussex wine has temporary protected status in the UK.

Since protected status was given to Sussex wines in 2016, wine producers must meet stringent quality guidelines in order to display the name of the county on their wines. The first wine to be produced under the Sussex PDO scheme was approved in 2016 for Rathfinny estate.  PDO status means that all wines using the name 'Sussex wine' have to be produced in Sussex from grapes grown in Sussex.

The idea came from Jamie Everett, chief operating officer of the Rathfinny estate, one of England's newest vineyards. The consortium, which includes the larger and older vineyards Ridgeview and Bolney estates, has the backing of the UK government. At least half the vineyards have supported the bid to give protected status to wine made from grapes grown in Sussex.

Wineries

Sussex boasts the largest and most densely planted cluster of vineyards (23 in total) in the UK.  In 2016 wine made in East and West Sussex accounted for about a quarter of the total produced in England.

See also
 Wine from the United Kingdom
 English sparkling wine
 Culture of Sussex
 Beer in Sussex

Bibliography

References

External links
Sussex Wineries website

British wine
 
Oastbrook